Keith Wilfred Smith (24 February 1926 – 30 March 2008) was an English actor who is known for his roles in The Army Game and The Beiderbecke Trilogy. Smith also appeared in The Fall and Rise of Reginald Perrin as a manager of a Grot shop.

Smith also appeared in George and Mildred in the episode My Husband Next Door, on 1 November 1976 as the TV repair man taking away the Roper's TV set, in series 1.

Smith was a regular in the Q... with Spike Milligan.

He died in London on 30 March 2008 at the age of 82 from motor neurone disease.

Filmography

References

External links
 

1926 births
2008 deaths
English male television actors
English male film actors